The following highways are numbered 372:

Canada
 Quebec Route 372

Japan
 Japan National Route 372

United States
  Connecticut Route 372
  Georgia State Route 372
  Maryland Route 372
  Nevada State Route 372
  New York State Route 372
  Ohio State Route 372
  Pennsylvania Route 372
  Puerto Rico Highway 372
  Virginia State Route 372
  Wyoming Highway 372